Donato Alcalde Tieles (born 22 January 1964 in Spain) is a Spanish retired footballer.

Career

After playing for Real Avilés CF in the Spanish third division, Alcalde signed for Sporting de Gijón in La Liga, staying for eight seasons before leaving due to injury.

In 1994, he played for Landskrona BoIS in Sweden through former teammate Joakim Nilsson, who already played for them and invited him after a telephone conversation.

References

External links
 Tati Alcalde at BDFutbol
 Tati Alcalde at boishistoria.se

Living people
Spanish footballers
1964 births
Association football defenders
Real Avilés CF footballers
Sporting de Gijón players
Landskrona BoIS players
Deportivo Alavés players
S.C. Beira-Mar players
Allsvenskan players
Expatriate footballers in Sweden
Expatriate footballers in Portugal
Spanish expatriate sportspeople in Sweden
Spanish expatriate sportspeople in Portugal